Last Man Standing Live (CD + DVD, 2007, Killer Productions) is an album recorded live 2006, by Jerry Lee Lewis in cooperation with other musicians. Released March 2007.

Track listing CD
 "Roll Over Beethoven"
 "Chantilly Lace"
 "That Lucky Old Sun"
 "Lewis Boogie"
 "Lucille"
 "Don't Put No Headstone On My Grave"
 "Great Balls Of Fire"
 "Whole Lotta Shakin' Going On"

Track listing DVD
 "Great Balls Of Fire"
 "Chantilly Lace"
 "Green Green Grass of Home" (with Tom Jones)
 "End Of The Road" (with Tom Jones)
 "Who Will The Next Fool Be" (with Solomon Burke)
 "Today I Started Lovin' You Again" (with Solomon Burke)
 "Crazy Arms" (with Norah Jones)
 "Your Cheatin' Heart" (with Norah Jones)
 "Hadacol Boogie" (with Buddy Guy)
 "Don't Put No Headstone On My Grave"
 "Somewhere Over The Rainbow" (with Chris Isaak)
 "Cry" (with Chris Isaak)
 "Rockin' My Life Away" (with Ron Wood)
 "Lewis Boogie"
 "Bumming Around" (with Merle Haggard)
 "What'd I Say" (with Ivan Neville)
 "Once More With Feeling" (with Kris Kristofferson)
 "CC Rider" (with John Fogerty)
 "Will the Circle Be Unbroken" (with John Fogerty & Kris Kristofferson)
 "Good Golly Miss Molly" (with John Fogerty)
 "Trouble In Mind" (with Ron Wood)
 "Jambalaya" (with Willie Nelson)
 "You Win Again" (with Don Henley)
 "Little Queenie" (with Kid Rock)
 "Honky Tonk Woman" (with Kid Rock)
 "That Lucky Old Sun" (with Ken Lovelace)
 "Roll Over Beethoven"
 "Whole Lotta Shakin' Going On"
 Bonus Track: "Goodnight Irene" (with Merle Haggard)

Personnel
Jerry Lee Lewis: vocals and piano
Tom Jones, Solomon Burke, Norah Jones, Buddy Guy, Chris Isaak, Merle Haggard, Ivan Neville, Kris Kristofferson, John Fogerty, Willie Nelson, Don Henley, Kid Rock: vocals
Kenny Lovelace: guitar
Jimmy Rip: guitar/Music Producer
Ronnie Wood: guitar
Nils Lofgren: steel guitar and acoustic bass
Hutch Hutchinson: bass
Jim Keltner: drums
Ivan Neville: organ
Stacey Michelle and Maxayn Lewis: background vocals

Recording details
Most of the material on the DVD "Last Man Standing Live" was recorded on September 28 and 29, 2006 at Sony Studios in New York City. (Note: September 29 was Jerry Lee Lewis' 71st birthday).

Jerry Lee Lewis albums
2007 live albums
2007 video albums
Live video albums
Self-released albums